Faridabad is an Indian name and may refer to:

Greater Faridabad
Faridabad district
Faridabad (Lok Sabha constituency)
Faridabad Thermal Power Plant
Faridabad Thermal Power Station
Faridabad New Town railway station
Faridabad railway station
Faridabad Old metro station

See also
Municipal Corporation of Faridabad
Delhi Faridabad Skyway
Faridabad-NOIDA-Ghaziabad expressway